Heterotropa is a monotypic moth genus in the subfamily Arctiinae. Its single species, Heterotropa fastosa, is found in Australia's Northern Territory and Queensland. Both the genus and species were first described by Turner in 1940.

The forewings have a bold pattern of yellow, brown and white.

References

Lithosiini
Monotypic moth genera
Moths of Australia